Phillip Bradley (born 18 May 1955) is an Australian military historian who has written nine books as well as numerous articles for Wartime and After the Battle magazine.  He has been described as "One of the finest chroniclers of the Australian Army's role in the New Guinea campaign".

Bradley has travelled many Australian battlefields, including sites in Papua New Guinea, Turkey and France.

Published works

Books

Selected articles
"Shaggy Ridge" (After the Battle, No 103).
"It Happened Here – Bravery in New Guinea" (After the Battle, No 113).
"Tragedy at Jackson's Strip" (Wartime, 2003, No 23).
"Assault on the Pimple" (Wartime, 2004, No 28).
"The Last Stand at Wandumi" (Wartime, 2005, No 29).
"'Slugger'" (Wartime, 2006, No 36).
"The Kokoda Trail" (After the Battle, 2007, No 137).
"The Battle for Saint-Lo" (After the Battle, 2007, No 138).
"The Battle for Buna" (After the Battle, 2013, No 162).

Grants
Bradley has received a number of grants from the Australian Army History Unit, these include:

2010–11 – The Capture of Lae: September 1943
2009–10 – The Capture of Lae: September 1943
2008–09 – The Salamaua Campaign: March–September 1943
2007–08 – The Salamaua Campaign: March–September 1943
2006–07 – The Wau Campaign: March 1942 – February 1943
2005–06 – The Wau Campaign, March 1942 – February 1943

References

External links
Pacific Wreck Database: Phil Bradley Interview
Allen and Unwin-Author Display: Phillip Bradley Profile

1955 births
Living people
Australian historians
Australian military historians